Gaston Quiribet (1888–1972) was a French film director, cinematographer, and writer. He worked for Hepworth Studios. He used stop motion techniques to achieve cinematographic tricks.

At the 2005 British Silent Film Festival, David Williams gave a presentation titled: Gaston Quiribet That Clever Frenchman.

Filmography

Director
A Day with the Gipsies (1906)
Once Aboard the Lugger (1920), along with George Ames
The Malvern Hills (1920)
Mr. Justice Raffles (film) (1921)
A Day with the Gypsies (ca. 1922)
Fugitive Futurist: A Q-Riosity (1924)
The Night of the Knight (1924)
The Death Ray (1924 film), a Q-Riosity film
The Quaint Q's (1925)	Director
Q-riosities by 'Q''' (1925)Plots and Blots (1925)

CinematographerAround Bettws-Y-Coed (1909)Autumn in the Forest (1909)Burnham Beeches (film) (1909)From the Woodland to the Sea (1915)Village and Wood (1915)Among the Mountains of North Wales (1915)A Ramble in the New Forest'' (1915)

References

External links

1888 births
1972 deaths
French film directors
French expatriates in the United Kingdom
French cinematographers